Pusztaszabolcs is a town in Fejér County, Hungary.

Sights 
 Reformed church
 Roman Catholic church
 MÁV 375 series steam locomotive

Twin towns – sister cities
Pusztaszabolcs is twinned with:

  Staufenberg, Germany
  Dorobanți, Romania

Gallery

References

External links

  in Hungarian
 Street map 

Populated places in Fejér County